Insignificance is the second singer-songwriter album by Jim O'Rourke, originally released on November 19, 2001 by Drag City. It is named after the Nicolas Roeg film of the same name. It peaked at number 35 on the UK Independent Albums Chart.

Critical reception

At Metacritic, which assigns a weighted average score out of 100 to reviews from mainstream critics, the album received an average score of 81% based on 16 reviews, indicating "universal acclaim".

Pitchfork placed it at number 166 on their list of top 200 albums of the 2000s.

Track listing

Personnel
Credits adapted from liner notes.
 Jim O'Rourke
 Rob Mazurek – cornet (1, 4, 6)
 Ken Vandermark – saxophone (3)
 Jeff Tweedy – harmonica (1), guitar (3, 6)
 Ken Champion – pedal steel guitar (5, 7)
 Darin Gray – bass guitar (1, 3, 4, 6, 7)
 Glenn Kotche – drums (all tracks), vibraphone (5)
 Tim Barnes – drums (1, 3, 4, 6, 7)

Charts

References

External links
 

2001 albums
Jim O'Rourke (musician) albums
Drag City (record label) albums
Domino Recording Company albums
P-Vine Records albums